Jan Sandmann (born 3 May 1978 in Burg bei Magdeburg, East Germany) is a German former football player.

Career
He made his debut on the professional league level in the Bundesliga for Hamburger SV on 23 September 2000 when he came on as a substitute in the 67th minute in a game against VfL Wolfsburg. He also played in the UEFA Champions League qualification games against Brøndby IF that season, as well as UEFA Cup matches against A.S. Roma.

References

External links
 

1978 births
Living people
German footballers
1. FC Magdeburg players
Hamburger SV players
Hamburger SV II players
1. FC Union Berlin players
Holstein Kiel players
Bundesliga players
2. Bundesliga players
Association football defenders
People from Burg bei Magdeburg
Footballers from Saxony-Anhalt